David Theodore Blaauw is a professor in the Electrical and Computer Engineering program at  the University of Michigan, Ann Arbor, MI was named Fellow of the Institute of Electrical and Electronics Engineers (IEEE) in 2012 for contributions to adaptive and low power circuit design.

Education 
B.S. from Duke University, 1986
Ph.D. from the University of Illinois, Urbana

References 

Fellow Members of the IEEE
Living people
University of Michigan faculty
Duke University alumni
Grainger College of Engineering alumni
Year of birth missing (living people)
American electrical engineers